Eileen Elizabeth Sheridan (1936–2018) was a British beauty pageant contestant who was also known for her association with the London underworld 'firm' headed by the Kray twins; notably attending the funeral of their elder brother, Charlie, in 2000. And also attended the funerals of Ron and Reg Kray.
Eileen was a character witness at Charlie Krays' drug trail, and provided the famous "Legend" wreath at Reg Krays funeral.
Miss Sheridan became friends with the Krays after becoming the first winner of the Miss United Kingdom title in 1958. Her future husband persuaded her to enter the new Miss UK competition in Blackpool. And she was placed in final six of 1958 Miss World Contest, held at the Lyceum.

Early career
Born in 1936 in Surrey, as Eileen Elizabeth Wheeler, the teenage Eileen was interested in athletics and horse riding. Upon leaving school, she was spotted working in a department store by a photographer who persuaded her to sign up with the Cherry Marshall model agency in Mayfair.  Miss Sheridan married a former bookmaker two years after winning her Miss UK title, becoming Eileen Sheridan-Price, after completing the double by winning Miss Great Britain, in 1960 at Morecambe. Eileen enjoyed running and was a regular at many athletic events in the south east.

Life after the pageant
Sheridan spent ten years performing in old-time musicals as a male impersonator. She met her husband when she was 14 and was married to Ken Price until his death in 2005.

Eileen died on 31 August 2018 and is buried with her husband Ken in Molesey Cemetery, Surrey

References 

Miss United Kingdom winners
Miss World 1958 delegates
2018 deaths
1936 births